Asmir Suljić (born 11 September 1991) is a Bosnian professional footballer who plays as a winger. He plays for Kazakhstani club Tobol.

Club career
Suljić started his professional career at one of the biggest Bosnian-Herzegovinian clubs, Sarajevo, for whom he debuted in August 2010, aged 18. He quickly established himself as one of the best players in the league, earning himself nickname šejtan (the devil).

In 2013, he was transferred to Hungarian club Újpest.

At the end of August 2015, he switched clubs again, this time going to the reigning Hungarian champions Videoton.

In February 2018 he signed a two-year contract with Polish side Wisła Kraków, which was to enter into force on 1 July that year, but Suljić refuse to play in Wisła and his contract was canceled.

International career
Suljić appeared in one game for Bosnia and Herzegovina under-21 team.

In March 2017 he acquired a Hungarian passport, making him eligible to play for Hungary.

Career statistics

Club

Honours
Újpest
Hungarian Cup: 2013–14
Hungarian Super Cup: 2014

Videoton
Hungarian League: 2017–18

Olimpija Ljubljana
Slovenian Cup: 2018–19

References

External links
HLSZ 

1991 births
Living people
People from Srebrenica
FK Sarajevo players
Újpest FC players
Fehérvár FC players
NK Olimpija Ljubljana (2005) players
Zagłębie Lubin players
Maccabi Petah Tikva F.C. players
Diósgyőri VTK players
Premier League of Bosnia and Herzegovina players
Nemzeti Bajnokság I players
Slovenian PrvaLiga players
Ekstraklasa players
Israeli Premier League players
Bosnia and Herzegovina footballers
Bosnia and Herzegovina under-21 international footballers
Bosnia and Herzegovina expatriate footballers
Association football wingers
Expatriate footballers in Hungary
Expatriate footballers in Slovenia
Expatriate footballers in Poland
Expatriate footballers in Israel
Bosnia and Herzegovina expatriate sportspeople in Hungary
Bosnia and Herzegovina expatriate sportspeople in Slovenia
Bosnia and Herzegovina expatriate sportspeople in Poland
Bosnia and Herzegovina expatriate sportspeople in Israel